N. Sundararaj is an Indian politician and former Member of the Parliament - Lok Sabha Pudukkottai (Tamil Nadu) 3 times (8th Lok Sabha (1984–89), 9th Lok Sabha (1989–91), 10th Lok Sabha (1991–94)) and Member of the Legislative Assembly of Thirumayam (Tamil Nadu)two times. He was elected to the Tamil Nadu legislative assembly as an Indian National Congress candidate from Tirumayam constituency in 1977 election and from Indian National Congress (Indira) 1980 election.
 
He hold record of winning in high margin in all three Lok shabha election in Tamil Nadu and he won 2nd (second) highest vote difference in India next to Rajiv Ratna Gandhi.

Electoral victories

Indian Parliament

Tamil Nadu state assembly

References

External links
Assembly.tn.gov.in

Indian National Congress politicians from Tamil Nadu
1944 births
1994 deaths
India MPs 1984–1989
India MPs 1989–1991
India MPs 1991–1996
Lok Sabha members from Tamil Nadu
People from Pudukkottai district
Tamil Nadu MLAs 1977–1980
Tamil Nadu MLAs 1980–1984